Melanonaclia is a genus of moths in the subfamily Arctiinae.

Species
 Melanonaclia luctuosa (Oberthür, 1911)
 Melanonaclia lugens Oberthür, 1893
 Melanonaclia moerens Oberthür, 1911
 Melanonaclia nigra Griveaud, 1964
 Melanonaclia perplexa Griveaud, 1964
 Melanonaclia toulgoeti Griveaud, 1964

References

External links
Natural History Museum Lepidoptera generic names catalog

Arctiinae